The Kokshenga is a river in Tarnogsky District of Vologda Oblast and Ustyansky and Velsky Districts of Arkhangelsk Oblast in Russia. It is a left tributary of the Ustya and thus belongs to the Northern Dvina river basin. The area of its basin . Its main tributaries are the Pechenga (right) and Uftyuga (left). 

The Kokshenga begins from the confluence of the Ileza (right) and the Kortyuga (left) close to the village of Ivanovskaya of Tarnogsky District. The river flows west, accepts a major tributary, the Pechenga River, from the north, and turns south-west. In the rural locality (selo) of Tarnogsky Gorodok, the district center of Tarnogsky District, it accepts the Tarnoga from the left, and sharply turns north-west. Several kilometers downstream of Tarnogsky Gorodok it accepts the Uftyuga River from the left. Downstream of Tarnogsky Gorodok, the valley of the Kokshenga is heavily populated. The river enters the Arkhangelsk Oblast, crosses the corner of the Ustyansky District, and enters the Velsky District. It then crosses the railway line connecting Konosha and Kotlas close to Kokshenga railway station. The last portion of the Kokshenga valley, downstream of the village of the village of Uzhmino, is not populated.

References

External links

Rivers of Arkhangelsk Oblast
Rivers of Vologda Oblast